Lucia A. Simpson was a wooden, 3-mast schooner, 127 feet in length, with a 28-foot beam and 8.7 feet depth of hold. The gross tonnage was 227.07 with sail propulsion. The official number is: 140097.

Lucia A. Simpson was built in 1875 by Rand & Burger in Manitowoc, Wisconsin for Simpson & Co. of Milwaukee. Major repairs were done in 1883. Lucia A. Simpson was one of the last full-rigged schooners on the Great Lakes and one of the last still sailing into the 1930s.  In May 1929 she was disabled in a squall off Algoma and was towed to Sturgeon Bay for repairs. There is a report that on July 27, 1929 the car ferry Ann Arbor No. 7 sighted the schooner Lucia A. Simpson in distress and towed her to Kewaunee, Wisconsin.  In 1934, the Manitowoc Marine Museum considered purchasing her but on Dec. 3, 1935, a fire swept the "graveyard of ships" of the Sturgeon Bay Ship Building Company and destroyed her. There was no loss of life in the 1935 fire.

Owner History 
1875-1881 Simpson & Co. of Milwaukee 
1882-1899, owned by E.G. Filer, Manistee, Mich. 
1900, owned by Henry Durbin, South Milwaukee, Wis. 
1900, sold to Hans Simenson of Milwaukee - owner and Captain 
1901-1928, owned by Charles J. Sanderson, Milwaukee 
1929-30, owned by Northern Marine Corp., Milwaukee 
1931-35, owned by Town Harbor Yacht Club of Chicago but was still stored at the Sturgeon Bay Ship Building Co.

External links
Lucia A. Simpson
Ann Arbor No 7

Schooners of the United States
Sailing ships of the United States
1875 ships
Great Lakes freighters
Ships built in Manitowoc, Wisconsin